Franz Daniel Edler von Bartuska was a mayor of Vienna.

References 

Mayors of Vienna
18th-century Austrian people
Austrian people of Czech descent